The fourth season of the reality television series Love & Hip Hop: Hollywood aired on VH1 from July 24, 2017 until October 23, 2017. It was primarily filmed in Los Angeles, California. It is executively produced by Mona Scott-Young and Stephanie Gayle for Monami Entertainment, Toby Barraud, Stefan Springman, Mala Chapple, David DiGangi, Michael Lang and Gilda Brasch for Eastern TV, and Nina L. Diaz and Vivian Gomez for VH1.

The series chronicles the lives of several women and men in the Los Angeles area, involved in hip hop music. It consist of 16 episodes, including a two-part reunion special hosted by Nina Parker.

Production

Season four of Love & Hip Hop: Hollywood began filming in February 2017. On March 17, 2017, singer Keyshia Cole revealed that she had joined the cast for its newest season, along with her estranged ex-husband Daniel "Booby" Gibson. 

On April 13, 2017, VH1 announced that Love & Hip Hop: Hollywood would be returning for a fourth season on July 17, 2017. On June 19, 2017, VH1 revealed the show would premiere on July 24, 2017 and released a teaser confirming Cole's involvement with the show, along with a press release confirming the new cast members. Season four saw the promotion of Lyrica Anderson and Safaree Samuels to the main cast, as well as the return of Hazel-E after a season's absence. Lil Fizz and Masika Kalysha were removed from the opening credits and appear as supporting cast members, with Kalysha claiming on social media that her demotion was due to her refusal to film with longtime rival Alexis Skyy. New cast members include Brooke Valentine, songwriter Marcus Black, stylist Zellswag, Moniece's girlfriend A.D. Diggs, Fetty Wap's ex Alexis Skyy, Chanel West Coast, producer Solo Lucci and Bridget Kelly. Love & Hip Hop: New York stars Cisco Rosado and Jade Wifey would make special crossover appearances throughout the season. Although not included in the initial cast announcement, College Hills Misster Ray, Alexandra Shipp's brother James Shipp Jr. and A.D.'s friend Tiffany Campbell would also appear in supporting roles. 

On July 3, 2017, three weeks before the season four premiere, VH1 aired Dirty Little Secrets, a special featuring unseen footage and deleted scenes from the show's first three seasons, along with interviews with the show's cast and producers. On July 13, 2017, VH1 began releasing "meet the cast" interview promos  featuring new cast members Brooke Valentine, Booby Gibson, Marcus Black, Zellswag, A.D. Diggs and Alexis Skyy. On July 17, 2017, VH1 released a 6 minute super-trailer. 

During the season's reunion special, Safaree announced that he was leaving the show to join the cast of Love & Hip Hop: New York. On October 20, 2017, after sparking violent feuds with nearly every member of the cast and causing controversy for making a series of anti-gay and colorist posts on social media, it was reported that Hazel had been fired from the show. On February 7, 2018, it was reported that Keyshia Cole had quit the show, along with Masika Kaylsha, after breaking the fourth wall several times on the show to express her displeasure with producers, as well as threatening legal action and storming off set.

Cast

Starring

 Keyshia Cole (12 episodes)
 Moniece Slaughter (15 episodes)
 Teairra Marí (11 episodes)
 Nikki Mudarris (12 episodes)
 Lyrica Anderson (11 episodes)
 Hazel-E (13 episodes)
 Princess Love (6 episodes)
 Safaree Samuels (10 episodes)
 Ray J (9 episodes)

Also starring

 Daniel "Booby" Gibson (11 episodes)
 Masika Kalysha (12 episodes)
 Zellswag (14 episodes)
 Lil' Fizz (9 episodes)
 Brooke Valentine (14 episodes)
 Marcus Black (13 episodes)
 Alexis Skyy (13 episodes)
 A1 Bentley (12 episodes)
 Chanel West Coast (10 episodes)
 Jade Wifey (2 episodes)
 Solo Lucci (10 episodes)
 Cisco Rosado (7 episodes)
 A.D. Diggs (12 episodes)
 Misster Ray (10 episodes)
 Bridget Kelly (9 episodes)
 Nia Riley (9 episodes)
 James Shipp Jr. (6 episodes)
 Tiffany Campbell (4 episodes)

Hazel's boyfriend Rose Burgundy, Keyshia's cousin Marquisha Miller, Lyrica Garrett, Pam Bentley, Amber Diamond and Donatella appear as guest stars in several episodes. The show also features minor appearances from notable figures within the hip hop industry and Hollywood's social scene, including Too $hort, AngelGold, Solo Lucci's baby mama Sara Scott, Misster Ray's boyfriend Vic the Leo, Nikki's mother Michelle Mudarris, Moniece's cousin Stevie Mackey, Miss Diddy, Bobby Brown, J-Boog, Apryl Jones and Yesi Ortiz.

Episodes

Webisodes

Check Yourself
Love & Hip Hop Hollywood: Check Yourself, which features the cast's reactions to each episode, was released weekly with every episode on digital platforms.

Bonus scenes
Deleted scenes from the season's episodes were released weekly as bonus content on VH1's official website.

Music
Several cast members had their music featured on the show and released singles to coincide with the airing of the episodes.

References

External links

2017 American television seasons
Love & Hip Hop